Adrienne Warren (born May 6, 1987) is an American actress, singer and dancer. She made her Broadway debut in the 2012 musical Bring It On, and in 2016 received a Tony Award for Best Featured Actress in a Musical nomination for her performance in Shuffle Along, or, the Making of the Musical Sensation of 1921 and All That Followed. She was also praised for her role as Tina Turner in the West End production of Tina in 2018, and for the same role in the Broadway production, for which she received the Tony Award for Best Actress in a Musical in 2020.

Early life
Warren was born in Portsmouth, Virginia. She is the daughter of two high school coaches. She began her performance career in church. She attended high school at the Governor’s School for the Arts. Warren graduated from Marymount Manhattan College in 2009. She performed with the groups The Dream Engine and the Trans-Siberian Orchestra. She was a vocalist for the non-profit Magic-The State Of The Art.

Career
Warren began her career performing in musicals The Wiz and Dreamgirls before making her Broadway debut in the musical Bring It On in 2012. In 2016, she starred in Shuffle Along, or, the Making of the Musical Sensation of 1921 and All That Followed, for which she received Tony Award for Best Featured Actress in a Musical nomination. Warren also appeared in a number of television series, including Blue Bloods, Orange Is the New Black, and Black Box.

In 2018, Warren was cast as Tina Turner in the West End production of Tina. She received critical praise for her performance as Turner and a Laurence Olivier Award for Best Actress in a Musical nomination. The following year, she performed in the Broadway production, winning the 2020 Tony Award for Best Actress in a Musical in 2021.

In October 2020, it was announced that Warren was cast in her first television leading role in the ABC limited series Women of the Movement playing activist Mamie Till-Mobley, the mother of Emmett Till.

In December 2020, Warren narrated the audiobook of Tina Turner's memoir Happiness Becomes You, which was released by the Simon & Schuster imprint Atria Books.

In September 2021, Warren was cast in the epic film The Woman King starring Viola Davis. Inspired by true events from the 18th and 19th centuries Kingdom of Dahomey in Africa, Warren plays a warrior.

Work

Theatre

Film

Television

Awards and nominations

References

External links
 
 
 

1987 births
Living people
Marymount Manhattan College alumni
African-American actresses
Actresses from Virginia
Singers from Virginia
American stage actresses
American television actresses
American musical theatre actresses
21st-century American actresses
20th-century African-American women singers
21st-century African-American women
21st-century African-American people
Tony Award winners